Cnemidocarpa is a genus of ascidian tunicates in the family Styelidae.

Species within the genus Cnemidocarpa include:
 Cnemidocarpa acanthifera F. Monniot, 2011 
 Cnemidocarpa aculeata Kott, 1985 
 Cnemidocarpa alentura (Herdman, 1906) 
 Cnemidocarpa alisi Monniot, 1992 
 Cnemidocarpa amphora Kott, 1992 
 Cnemidocarpa annectens (Hartmeyer, 1921) 
 Cnemidocarpa areolata (Heller, 1878) 
 Cnemidocarpa barbata Vinogradova, 1962 
 Cnemidocarpa bathyphila Millar, 1955 
 Cnemidocarpa bicornuta (Sluiter, 1900) 
 Cnemidocarpa bifurcata Millar, 1964 
 Cnemidocarpa bythia (Herdman, 1881) 
 Cnemidocarpa calypso Monniot, 1970 
 Cnemidocarpa campylogona Millar, 1988 
 Cnemidocarpa cirrata Ärnbäck, 1922 
 Cnemidocarpa clara (Hartmeyer, 1906) 
 Cnemidocarpa clipeata (Ärnbäck, 1921) 
 Cnemidocarpa completa Kott, 1985 
 Cnemidocarpa concha Monniot, 2002 
 Cnemidocarpa cornicula Monniot, 1978 
 Cnemidocarpa devia Ärnbäck, 1931 
 Cnemidocarpa digonas Monniot C. & Monniot F., 1968 
 Cnemidocarpa drygalskii (Hartmeyer, 1911) 
 Cnemidocarpa effracta Monniot, 1978 
 Cnemidocarpa eposi Monniot & Monniot, 1994 
 Cnemidocarpa fertilis (Hartmeyer, 1906) 
 Cnemidocarpa finmarkiensis (Kiaer, 1893) 
 Cnemidocarpa fissa Kott, 1985 
 Cnemidocarpa floccosa (Sluiter, 1904) 
 Cnemidocarpa hemprichi Hartmeyer, 1916 
 Cnemidocarpa humilis (Heller, 1878) 
 Cnemidocarpa incubita (Sluiter, 1904) 
 Cnemidocarpa intestinata Kott, 1985 
 Cnemidocarpa irene (Hartmeyer, 1906) 
 Cnemidocarpa jacens Monniot & Monniot, 2003 
 Cnemidocarpa javensis Millar, 1975 
 Cnemidocarpa joannae (Herdman, 1898) 
 Cnemidocarpa lapidosa (Herdman, 1906) 
 Cnemidocarpa lobata (Kott, 1952) 
 Cnemidocarpa longata (Kott, 1954) 
 Cnemidocarpa margaritifera Michaelsen, 1919 
 Cnemidocarpa minuta (Herdman, 1881) 
 Cnemidocarpa miyadii Tokioka, 1949 
 Cnemidocarpa mollis (Stimpson, 1852) 
 Cnemidocarpa mollispina Ärnbäck, 1922 
 Cnemidocarpa mortenseni (Hartmeyer, 1912) 
 Cnemidocarpa nisiotis (Sluiter, 1900) 
 Cnemidocarpa nordenskjöldi (Michaelsen, 1898) 
 Cnemidocarpa novaezelandiae (Michaelsen, 1912) 
 Cnemidocarpa ochotense Sanamyan, 1992 
 Cnemidocarpa ohlini (Michaelsen, 1898) 
 Cnemidocarpa oligocarpa (Sluiter, 1885) 
 Cnemidocarpa otagoensis Brewin, 1952 
 Cnemidocarpa pedata (Herdman, 1881) 
 Cnemidocarpa personata (Herdman, 1899) 
 Cnemidocarpa pfefferi (Michaelsen, 1898) 
 Cnemidocarpa platybranchia Millar, 1955 
 Cnemidocarpa posthuma Hartmeyer, 1927 
 Cnemidocarpa psammophora Millar, 1962 
 Cnemidocarpa quadrata (Herdman, 1881) 
 Cnemidocarpa radicata (Millar, 1962) 
 Cnemidocarpa radicosa (Herdman, 1882) 
 Cnemidocarpa ramosa Nishikawa, 1991 
 Cnemidocarpa recta Monniot, 1991 
 Cnemidocarpa reticulata Millar, 1975 
 Cnemidocarpa rhizopus (Redikorzev, 1907) 
 Cnemidocarpa robinsoni Hartmeyer, 1916 
 Cnemidocarpa sabulosa Glémarec & Monniot C., 1966 
 Cnemidocarpa schumacheri Monniot, 2002 
 Cnemidocarpa sedata (Sluiter, 1904) 
 Cnemidocarpa sericata (Herdman, 1888) 
 Cnemidocarpa serpentina (Sluiter, 1912) 
 Cnemidocarpa squamata Lützen, 1970 
 Cnemidocarpa stewartensis Michelsen, 1922 
 Cnemidocarpa stolonifera (Herdman, 1899) 
 Cnemidocarpa subpinguis (Herdman, 1923) 
 Cnemidocarpa tenerispinosa Tokioka & Nishikawa, 1978 
 Cnemidocarpa tinaktae (Van Name, 1918) 
 Cnemidocarpa traustedti (Sluiter, 1890) 
 Cnemidocarpa tribranchiata Kott, 1992 
 Cnemidocarpa tripartita Kott, 1985 
 Cnemidocarpa univesica F. Monniot, 2011 
 Cnemidocarpa verrucosa (Lesson, 1830) 
 Cnemidocarpa victoriae Monniot & Monniot, 1983 
 Cnemidocarpa zenkevitchi Vinogradova, 1958

Species names currently considered to be synonyms:
 Cnemidocarpa acuelata Kott, 1985: synonym of Cnemidocarpa aculeata Kott, 1985 
 Cnemidocarpa asymmetra (Hartmeyer, 1912): synonym of Asterocarpa humilis (Heller, 1878) 
 Cnemidocarpa aucklandica Bovien, 1921: synonym of Asterocarpa humilis (Heller, 1878) 
 Cnemidocarpa cerea (Sluiter, 1900): synonym of Asterocarpa humilis (Heller, 1878) 
 Cnemidocarpa chinensis Tokioka, 1967: synonym of Polycarpa chinensis (Tokioka, 1967) 
 Cnemidocarpa coerulea (Quoy & Gaimard, 1834): synonym of Asterocarpa coerulea (Quoy & Gaimard, 1834) 
 Cnemidocarpa etheridgii (Herdman, 1899): synonym of Cnemidocarpa radicosa (Herdman, 1882) 
 Cnemidocarpa gregaria (Kesteven, 1909): synonym of Asterocarpa humilis (Heller, 1878) 
 Cnemidocarpa hartmeyeri Michaelsen, 1918: synonym of Eusynstyela hartmeyeri Michaelsen, 1904 
 Cnemidocarpa hartogi Michaelsen, 1927: synonym of Cnemidocarpa irene (Hartmeyer, 1906) 
 Cnemidocarpa heterotentaculata Beniaminson, 1971: synonym of Cnemidocarpa clara (Hartmeyer, 1906) 
 Cnemidocarpa irma Hartmeyer, 1927: synonym of Cnemidocarpa irene (Hartmeyer, 1906) 
 Cnemidocarpa legalli Gravier, 1955: synonym of Cnemidocarpa irene (Hartmeyer, 1906) 
 Cnemidocarpa macrogastra (Oka, 1935): synonym of Cnemidocarpa clara (Hartmeyer, 1906) 
 Cnemidocarpa madagascariensis Hartmeyer, 1916: synonym of Cnemidocarpa hemprichi Hartmeyer, 1916 
 Cnemidocarpa masuii Tokioka, 1949: synonym of Cnemidocarpa miyadii Tokioka, 1949 
 Cnemidocarpa monnioti Beniaminson, 1971: synonym of Cnemidocarpa clara (Hartmeyer, 1906) 
 Cnemidocarpa peruviana Millar, 1970: synonym of Dicarpa pacifica Millar, 1964 
 Cnemidocarpa polyphlebodes (Hartmeyer, 1919): synonym of Polycarpa aurita (Sluiter, 1890) 
 Cnemidocarpa rectofissura Millar, 1982: synonym of Cnemidocarpa drygalskii (Hartmeyer, 1911) 
 Cnemidocarpa regalis Michaelsen, 1922: synonym of Cnemidocarpa madagascariensis var. regalis Michaelsen, 1922 
 Cnemidocarpa sabulifera (Ritter, 1913): synonym of Cnemidocarpa rhizopus (Redikorzev, 1907) 
 Cnemidocarpa sericator Kott, 1971: synonym of Cnemidocarpa sericata (Herdman, 1888) 
 Cnemidocarpa tinkatae (Van Name, 1918): synonym of Cnemidocarpa tinaktae (Van Name, 1918) 
 Cnemidocarpa translucida Peres, 1951: synonym of Polycarpa translucida (Peres, 1951) 
 Cnemidocarpa tricostata Millar, 1960: synonym of Dicarpa tricostata (Millar, 1960) 
 Cnemidocarpa valborg Hartmeyer, 1919: synonym of Cnemidocarpa irene (Hartmeyer, 1906) 
 Cnemidocarpa valborgi Hartmeyer, 1919: synonym of Cnemidocarpa irene (Hartmeyer, 1906) 
 Cnemidocarpa vestita (Alder, 1860): synonym of Cnemidocarpa mollis (Stimpson, 1852)

References

Stolidobranchia
Tunicate genera